White River Township is one of nine townships in Hamilton County, Indiana, United States. As of the 2010 census, its population was 2,486 and it contained 1,028 housing units. It is the least developed township in the county and the only one without an incorporated community of any kind within its boundaries.

History
White River Township was organized in 1823. It is the oldest township in Hamilton County.

Geography
The streams of Bear Creek, Deer Creek, Duck Creek, Dyers Creek, Lamberson Ditch, Lock Ditch, Long Branch, Rogers Ditch, Sugar Run, and Weasel Creek run through this township.

Unincorporated communities
 Aroma
 Omega
 Strawtown
 Walnut Grove

(This list is based on USGS data and may include former settlements.)

Adjacent townships
 Madison Township, Tipton County (north)
 Pipe Creek Township, Madison County (northeast)
 Jackson Township, Madison County (east)
 Stony Creek Township, Madison County (southeast)
 Wayne Township (south)
 Noblesville Township (southwest)
 Jackson Township (west)
 Cicero Township, Tipton County (northwest)

Cemeteries
The township contains seven cemeteries: Buscher, Carey, Grubbs, Little Carey, Aroma Methodist, Newland, and Bethlehem (Cicero).

Major highways
 Indiana State Road 13
 Indiana State Road 37
 Indiana State Road 213

References
 U.S. Board on Geographic Names (GNIS)
 United States Census Bureau cartographic boundary files

External links
 Indiana Township Association
 United Township Association of Indiana

Townships in Hamilton County, Indiana
Townships in Indiana